WMUN-CD, UHF digital channel 45, was a low-powered, Class A television station licensed to New York, New York, United States. The station was owned by Local TV Media Holdings.

History

As W57BC, WLIG, and WLNY
Founded in 1988, the station was owned by WLIG (now WLNY-TV). It was an independent translator station out of Mineola, New York, after W44AI (now WNYX-LD) moved the license to New York City as an independent station airing public access TV. In the following years, the call letters changed to WLIG-LP in 1995, to WLNY-LP in 1996, and to WLIG-CD in 2010. Despite the call changes, the programming stayed much the same. After WLNY-TV was sold to CBS Television Stations, the translator station was sold to Local Media in 2012 and temporarily ceased broadcasting.

As WMUN-CD
In mid-2012, the call letters changed to WMUN-CD, and the station began running Classic Arts Showcase full-time. By late 2012, CAS was dropped and the station began airing infomercials. The following year, children's programming was added to fulfill E/I requirements, plus locally produced programming such as Community Impact. In the summer of 2014, The Balancing Act was added to the station's afternoon lineup.

WMUN-CD was the third television station that operated W19EH-D as a translator, behind WEBR-CD, WCBS-TV and WPIX.

Community Impact was moved to late afternoons in 2015, and additional children's programming was added for an hour on weekday and weekend afternoons, thus exceeding the E/I requirements. A few weeks later, the children's programming, along with public affairs programming, was dropped and the station began to air infomercials full-time. The following year, E/I programming returned on the air.

On April 13, 2017, the Federal Communications Commission (FCC) announced that WMUN-CD was a successful bidder in the spectrum auction, and would be surrendering its license in exchange for $23,191,413. Local Media TV surrendered WMUN-CD's license to the FCC for cancellation on August 28, 2017.

Digital television

Digital channels
The station's digital channel is multiplexed:

In March 2015, home shopping channel Jewelry TV was added to the station's 45.2 sub-channel under the name WMUN-2.

References

External links
Call Sign History – Federal Communications Commission

Mineola, New York
MUN-CD
Low-power television stations in the United States
Television channels and stations established in 1988
1988 establishments in New York (state)
Defunct television stations in the United States
Television channels and stations disestablished in 2017
2017 disestablishments in New York (state)
MUN-CD